Mission: Impossible – Ghost Protocol (Music from the Motion Picture) is the score album to the 2011 film Mission: Impossible – Ghost Protocol. The fourth installment in the Mission: Impossible film series, starring Tom Cruise, the film is directed by Brad Bird (in his live-action debut) and featured musical score composed by Michael Giacchino, who scored for Mission: Impossible III (2006), and also for Bird's previous animated films, The Incredibles (2004) and Ratatouille (2007). Varèse Sarabande released the soundtrack on December 13, 2011.

Development 
Ghost Protocol's soundtrack has a Russian-influence, in tune to the film's setting. The scoring process was delayed, due to Giacchino's commitments on scoring Cars 2 and Super 8. The recording of the score on August 2011 at the Newman Scoring Stage in 20th Century Fox Studios at Los Angeles, California, and was completed early-December.

As in previous installments, the score incorporates Lalo Schifrin's themes from the original television series. Explaining the stylistic influence generated by Schifrin's history with the franchise, Giacchino said "Lalo is an amazing jazz writer. You know you can't write a straight-up jazz score for a film like this but you can certainly hint at it here and there". He used a 6/8 – 2/4 rhythmic pattern of the theme, instead of a 5/4 rhythmic pattern, which Giacchino added that, traditionally in that tune, the lower strings are first played using the "Bom, Bom, Bom-Bom" theme followed by upper strings and woodwinds. But, he did not use strings for that melody, and instead give energy on the melodic tunes, playing "Bop-pa-pa, Bop-pa-pa...". The tune was played using an electric guitar and limited the strings in the lower level, with a slower version of the main melody being overlapped by a jazz theme in the upper layer.

He then described the idea, to Bird who called it as "astonishing" and gave creative freedom to work on that tune. He wanted to make the theme as "modern and hip and energetic and oppressive as you possibly can and that will just keep the audience busy".

Release history 
Varèse Sarabande released the soundtrack of Ghost Protocol on December 13, 2011 in digital and physical formats.

To honor the 10th anniversary of the film's release, in May 2022, Mondo announced two double-disc vinyl sets. The soundtrack is pressed in a 180-gram yellow marble (sand storm) and black colored vinyl. The album also featured two cover artworks from different stills, one featuring Tom Cruise as Ethan Hunt climbing on a Burj Khalifa, and the other featured a darkened side profile of Cruise, in the film. Pre-orders for the vinyl disc began on May 11, 2022, and was marketed and released on June 3, 2022.

Mondo also released a slip-case featuring vinyl disc of the soundtracks from the first four instalments, including the vinyl edition of Ghost Protocol soundtrack.

Reception 
Ghost Protocol's score received positive critical response. James Christopher Monger of Allmusic gave the score 7.5 out of 10. In his review for MTV, Williams Goss praised Giacchino's score as "another rousing score that leaps forth from the classic themes of the show to define itself in rightfully thrilling ways". Justin Chang of Variety wrote "Michael Giacchino once again supplies jazzy, propulsive riffs on Lalo Schifrin’s classic theme". Todd McCarthy of The Hollywood Reporter also wrote "Michael Giacchino‘s active, imaginative, nearly ever-present score nicely incorporates Lalo Schifrin‘s original TV theme, as the previous films also did."  David Edelstein of Vulture opined that "Giacchino does more variations on Schifrin’s M:I theme than Beethoven did on Diabelli's".

Mfiles wrote "The composer's attention to detail is particularly impressive: rarely a moment goes by when he isn't introducing a new motif, reprising his own ideas or adapting Schifrin's previous themes. Consistent with both the original sound of the TV series and his earlier score for the third film, Giacchino mixes together a plethora of ideas, meaning there's rarely a dull moment. Mission Impossible: Ghost Protocol is one of Giacchino's most entertaining scores and one of the most entertaining action adventure scores of 2011." James Southall of Movie Wave called it as "a solid enough score – though far from one of the composer’s finest – but the recording just drags all the life out of it". Filmtracks.com wrote "Giacchino scores all are among the driest, flattest, and dullest currently recorded and released on album, but Ghost Protocol is so muted at times that it seems like it's practically in monaural sound. The completely dead mix continues to diminish even Giacchino's liveliest works."

Track listing

Charts

Personnel 
Credits adapted from CD liner notes

 Music producer – Michael Giacchino
 Score recordist – Tim Lauber
 Recorded by – Dan Wallin 
 Mixed by – Dan Wallin
 Mastered by – Erick Labson
 Musical assistance – Dave Martina, Griffy Giacchino
 Score editor – Michael Bauer, Ramiro Belgardt, Tommy Lockett
 Supervising score editor – Alex Levy
 Liner notes – Brad Bird, Michael Giacchino
 Music co-ordinator – Andrea Datzman, Jason Richmond
 Copyist – Nicholas Jacobson-Larson, Booker White
 Scoring crew – Ryan Robinson, Tom Hardisty
 Executive producer – Robert Townson
 Executive in charge of music – Randy Spendlove
 Choir
 Choir – Page LA Studio Voices
 Baritone – Amick Byram, Guy Maeda, James Creswell, Norman Large
 Bass – Michael Geiger, Reid Bruton, Royce Reynolds, Vatsche Barsoumian
 Tenor – Agostino Castagnola, Gerald White, John Kimberling, Jonathan Mack
 Vocal contractor – Bobbi Page
 Orchestra
 Orchestra – The Hollywood Studio Symphony
 Orchestrator – Andrea Datzman, Brad Dechter, Michael Giacchino
 Orchestra conductor  – Tim Simonec
 Orchestra contractor – Reggie Wilson
 Concertmaster – Clayton Haslop
 Stage engineer – Denis Saint-Amand
 Stage manager – Greg Dennen, Tom Steele, Jamie Olvera
 Pro-tools operator – Vincent Cirelli
 Instrumentation
 Bass – Dave Stone , Charles Nenneker, Ed Meares, Karl Vincent, Nico Abondolo, Norm Ludwin, Peter Doubrovsky, Timothy Emmons
 Bass clarinet – John Mitchell
 Bass trombone – Bill Reichenbach, Phillip Teele
 Bassoon – Rose Corrigan , Andy Radford
 Celeste – Mark Gasbarro
 Cello – Steve Richards , Armen Ksajikian, Dermot Mulroney, Giovanna Clayton, John Acosta, Kevan Torfeh, Stefanie Fife, Suzie Katayama, Timothy Landauer, Vahe Hayrikyan, Victor Lawrence
 Clarinet – Michael Vaccaro , Don Markese
 Drum – Bernie Dresel
 Electric bass – Abe Laboriel
 English horn – Joseph Stone
 Flute – Bobby Shulgold , Dick Mitchell, Steve Kujala
 French horn – Brad Warnaar, Joseph Meyer, John Reynolds, Mark Adams, Nathan Campbell, Phillip Yao, Steve Becknell, Steve Durnin
 French Horn [principal] – Brian O'Connor , Rick Todd 
 Guitar – Carl Verheyen, George Doering
 Harp – Gayle Levant
 Oboe – John Yoakum
 Keyboards – Mark Le Vang
 Percussion – Dan Greco , Alex Neciosup-Acuna, Emile Radocchia, Mike Englander, Walter Rodriguez
 Piano – Mark Gasbarro
 Timpani – Don Williams
 Trombone – Alex Iles , Alan Kaplan, Steve Holtman
 Trumpet – Malcolm McNab , Jeff Bunnell, Paul Salvo, Rick Baptist, Wayne Bergeron
 Tuba – John Van Houten , Douglas Tornquist
 Viola – Darrin McCann , Alan Busteed, Caroline Buckman, Evan Wilson, Harry Shirinian, Jorge Moraga, Karen Elaine, Karie Prescott, Maria Newman, Pamela Goldsmith, Richard Rintoul, Robert Brophy, Victoria Miskolczy
 Violin – Ken Yerke , Aimee Kreston, Alex Shlifer, Alyssa Park, Anatoly Rosinsky, Barbra Porter, Cameron Patrick, Carolyn Osborn, Charles Bisharat, Darius Campo, Galina Golovin, Gina Kronstadt, Haim Shtrum, Jackie Brand, Jim Sitterly, Joel Derouin, John Wittenberg, Josefina Vergara, Larry Greenfield, Marina Manukian, Mark Robertson, Miran Kojian, Miwako Watanabe, Norman Hughes, Peter Kent, Phillip Levy, Rafael Rishik, Razdan Kuyumjian, Rebecca Bunnell, Ron Clark, Sara Parkins, Shalini Vijayan, Shari Zippert, Sid Page, Tereza Stanislav, Terry Glenny, Tiffany Hu
 Vocals – Charanjeet Virdi, Farah Kidwai, Mala Ganguly

Notes 
  Contains Mission: Impossible Theme by Lalo Schifrin
  Contains Mission: Impossible Theme and "The Plot" by Lalo Schifrin

References 

Action film soundtracks
Mission: Impossible music
Varèse Sarabande soundtracks
2011 soundtrack albums
Michael Giacchino soundtracks
Mission: Impossible (film series)